Grasshoff is a German surname, "Gras" meaning "grass", "Hof" meaning "court" or "farm". Spelling variants are Graßhoff, Grashoff, Graßhof or Grashof.

Alex Grasshoff (1928–2008), American documentary filmmaker
Franz Grashof (1826–1893), German engineer
Fritz Grasshoff, born Graßhoff (1913–1997), German artist, painter, writer
Johann Grasshoff (c.1560–1623), Pomeranian jurist and alchemical writer
Karin Graßhof (born 1937), German jurist
Kurt Grasshoff (1891–1918), German pilot
Rik Grashoff (born 1961), Dutch engineer and politician
Thorsten Grasshoff or Paul T. Grasshoff (born 1969), German actor (in German)

See also
Grashof condition, used when analysing kinematic chains, named after Franz Grashof
Grashof number, dimensionless number in fluid dynamics and  heat transfer, named after Franz Grashof

German-language surnames
Surnames